Carex plantaginea, commonly known as carex plantain, plaintainleaf sedge, or seersucker sedge, is a perennial herb of the sedge family.

Description
It is distributed across much of eastern North America, from New Brunswick to Georgia, west to Minnesota and Iowa.

References

External links 
 

plantaginea
Plants described in 1792
Flora of Alabama